Elizabeth Natalie Schram (born July 17, 1968) is an American actress best known for playing Sharona Fleming in the television series Monk and for playing Evelyn Gardner in the film A League of Their Own (1992).

Early life
Born in Mountainside, New Jersey, Schram attended Jonathan Dayton High School, where she was a competitive athlete. She studied at the University of Maryland on a tennis scholarship and graduated with a degree in advertising design. Having known for a number of years that she wanted to act, she pursued roles in both film and television as well as Broadway theater. Bitty was a nickname she decided to use when she became an actress. Schram adheres to Judaism.

Career

The role that initially brought her note was that of Evelyn Gardner, the Rockford Peaches' right fielder, in the Penny Marshall film A League of Their Own. Her character was the recipient of the classic admonition by manager Jimmy Dugan (Tom Hanks), "There's no crying in baseball!"

During 1993-95, she appeared in the original Broadway production of Neil Simon's Laughter on the 23rd Floor.

In 2002, Schram landed a major role opposite Tony Shalhoub on the USA Network series Monk. She was released midway through the show's third season. The network stated they had "decided to go in a different creative direction with some of its characters." The Hollywood Reporter reported that "some members of the series' supporting cast, including Schram, Ted Levine and Jason Gray-Stanford, attempted to renegotiate the terms of their contract[s]" and cited Schram's departure as evidence of the industry's "hard line against raise-seeking actors who aren't absolutely essential to the show." Levine and Gray-Stanford remained on the show. Natalie Teeger, played by Traylor Howard, replaced her character as Monk's assistant. Schram made a guest appearance on one episode of the show's eighth and final season, titled "Mr. Monk and Sharona".

Filmography

Film

Television

References

External links
 
 

1968 births
Actresses from New Jersey
American film actresses
American television actresses
Jewish American actresses
Living people
People from Mountainside, New Jersey
University of Maryland, College Park alumni
20th-century American actresses
21st-century American actresses
21st-century American Jews
Jonathan Dayton High School alumni